is a JR East railway station located in the city of Kazuno, Akita Prefecture, Japan.

Lines
Suehiro Station is served by the Hanawa Line, and is located 82.8 rail kilometers from the terminus of the line at Kōma Station.

Station layout
Suehiro Station consists of a single side platform serving one bi-directional track. The station is unattended.

History
Passenger services began from January 6, 1916. The station was renamed to its present name on March 1, 1920. The line was nationalized on June 1, 1934, becoming part of the Japanese Government Railways (JGR) system. The JGR became the Japan National Railways (JNR) after World War II. The station has been unattended since February 1, 1962. The station was absorbed into the JR East network upon the privatization of the JNR on April 1, 1987. A new shelter was built on the platform in 2005.

Surrounding area
  Route 103

See also
 List of Railway Stations in Japan

External links

  

Railway stations in Japan opened in 1915
Kazuno, Akita
Hanawa Line
Railway stations in Akita Prefecture
Stations of East Japan Railway Company